The New Journalism is a 1973 anthology of journalism edited by Tom Wolfe and E. W. Johnson. The book is both a manifesto for a new type of journalism by Wolfe, and a collection of examples of New Journalism by American writers, covering a variety of subjects from the frivolous (baton twirling competitions) to the deadly serious (the Vietnam War). The pieces are notable because they do not conform to the standard dispassionate and even-handed model of journalism. Rather they incorporate literary devices usually only found in fictional works.

Manifesto
The first section of the book consists of four previously published texts by Wolfe: The Feature Game and Like a Novel (published as The Birth of "The New Journalism": An Eyewitness Report and The New Journalism: A la Recherche des Whichy Thickets, in the New York Magazine, on February 14 and February 21, 1972); Seizing the Power and Appendix (published as Why They Aren't Writing the Great American Novel Anymore, in Esquire, December 1972).

The text is a diatribe against the American novel which Wolfe sees as having hit a dead end by moving away from realism, and his opinion that journalism is much more relevant.  In effect, his manifesto is for mixing journalism with literary techniques to document in a more effective way than the novel. These techniques were most likely inspired by writers of social realism, such as Émile Zola and Charles Dickens.  His manifesto for New Journalism (although he had no great affection for the term) has four main points.
Scene by scene construction.  Rather than rely on second-hand accounts and background information, Wolfe considers it necessary for the journalist to witness events first hand, and to recreate them for the reader.
Dialogue. By recording dialogue as fully as possible, the journalist is not only reporting words, but defining and establishing character, as well as involving the reader.
The third person.  Instead of simply reporting the facts, the journalist has to give the reader a real feeling of the events and people involved.  One technique for achieving this is to treat the protagonists like characters in a novel.  What is their motivation?  What are they thinking?
Status details.  Just as important as the characters and the events, are the surroundings, specifically what people surround themselves with.  Wolfe  describes these items as the tools for a "social autopsy", so we can see people as they see themselves.

Anthology
Part two, which  makes up the major part of The New Journalism, consists of  twenty-four texts, collected by Wolfe and Johnson. Every text features a short introduction, written by Wolfe.

Texts

Truman Capote, In Cold Blood
The excerpt from In Cold Blood, is the fifth text in the anthology. The excerpt is taken from the third chapter titled Answers. In Cold Blood was initially, published as a four-part serial in The New Yorker, beginning with the September 25, 1965 issue.  Answers, which was the third part, was published in the October 25 issue.  The book details the brutal 1959 murders of Herbert Clutter, a wealthy farmer from Holcomb, Kansas, and his wife and two of their children. When Capote learned of the quadruple murder before the killers were captured, he decided to travel to Kansas and write about the crime. Bringing his childhood friend and fellow author Harper Lee along, together they interviewed local residents and investigators assigned to the case and took thousands of pages of notes. The killers, Richard "Dick" Hickock and Perry Smith, were arrested not long after the murders, and Capote ultimately spent six years working on the book.  It is considered the originator of the non-fiction novel and the forerunner of the New Journalism movement, although other writers, like Rodolfo Walsh, had already explored the genre in books like Operación Masacre.

In the introduction Wolfe writes "For all his attention to novelistic technique, however, Capote does not use point of view in as sophisticated way as he does in fiction. One seldom feels that he is really inside of the minds of the characters. One gets a curious blend of third-person point of view and omniscient narration. Capote probably had sufficient information to use point of view in a more complex fashion but was not yet ready to let himself go in nonfiction."

Robert Christgau, Beth Ann and Macrobioticism
Beth Ann and Macrobioticism, by Robert Christgau, is the 20th text in the anthology. It was Christgau's first magazine article In 1965 Christgau was a reporter for the Dorf Feature Service in Newark, NJ.

Reception

Notes

Bibliography

Primary sources

Contemporary reviews

The New Journalism

Texts in the anthology

Secondary sources

 

Books about journalism
Types of journalism
Books by Tom Wolfe
1975 non-fiction books
American anthologies
Harper & Row books